NFI Group Inc. is a Canadian multinational bus manufacturer, based in Winnipeg, Manitoba. The company employs 8,000 people across 50 facilities in nine countries. NFI Group owns Alexander Dennis, ARBOC Specialty Vehicles, Motor Coach Industries, New Flyer, Plaxton, NFI Parts, and Carfair Composites. The company is listed on the Toronto Stock Exchange under the symbol NFI, and is a constituent of the S&P/TSX Composite Index.

History
NFI Group was created on June 16, 2005 as the holding company of New Flyer Industries so it could be publicly traded on the Toronto Stock Exchange.

In October 2008, NFI Group. was named one of Canada's Top 100 Employers, which was announced in The Globe and Mail newspaper, and the company was featured in Maclean's newsmagazine. Later that month, New Flyer was also named one of Manitoba's Top Employers, which was announced by the Winnipeg Free Press newspaper.

The company converted to a corporate structure from a trust-like structure in October 2011.

Brazilian bus manufacturer Marcopolo S.A. acquired a 19.99% stake of New Flyer on January 23, 2013, for $116 million, the maximum it could acquire without offering to buy out other shareholders. Marcopolo would later reduce its stake in the company to 10.8% on September 22, 2016, although it remains the largest individual shareholder.

Mergers and acquisitions
Since 2013, the NFI Group has completed several mergers and acquisitions that have expanded the company beyond its original focus on heavy-duty transit buses for the North American market and into on several other bus types and markets.

Under the agreement, New Flyer acquired the Orion parts inventory, the company's accounts, licence to use proprietary part designs and agreed to provide parts for customer warranty support.

Upon completion of NABI's outstanding orders, New Flyer converted the former NABI factory in Anniston, AL into a fourth facility to produce the Xcelsior heavy-duty transit bus. 

On December 1, 2017, NFI acquired Middlebury, Indiana-based small cutaway and medium duty bus manufacturer ARBOC Specialty Vehicles for US$95 million.

Subsidiaries 
The company owns several subsidiaries that produce various kinds of buses:
 Alexander Dennis – Heavy-duty transit buses, double-deck transit buses and motorcoaches
 ARBOC Specialty Vehicles – Medium-duty transit buses and cutaway buses
 Motor Coach Industries – Motorcoaches
 New Flyer – Heavy-duty transit buses
 Plaxton – Motorcoaches for the European market

The company also owns a few companies that produce parts for buses:
 NFI Parts - Aftermarket bus parts 
 Carfair Composites - Fibreglass component supplier

Gallery

References

External links 

Bus manufacturers of Canada
Canadian companies established in 2005
Vehicle manufacturing companies established in 2005
Companies listed on the Toronto Stock Exchange
Manufacturing companies based in Winnipeg
2005 initial public offerings
2005 establishments in Manitoba